Joe Szczecko is a former professional American football player who played defensive tackle for four seasons for the Atlanta Falcons and New York Giants.

References

1942 births
American football defensive tackles
Atlanta Falcons players
New York Giants players
Northwestern Wildcats football players
Living people
Sportspeople from Freiburg (region)
People from Lahr